Calvin Lamar Pace (born October 28, 1980) is a former American football outside linebacker of the National Football League. He was drafted by the Arizona Cardinals in the first round (18th overall) in the 2003 NFL Draft. He played college football at Wake Forest.

Early years
Pace attended Lithia Springs High School in Lithia Springs, Georgia from 1994 to 1998.

College career

Freshman (1999)
In 1999, Pace played in seven games, and ranked 27th on the team in tackles. For the season he recorded four tackles, two for a loss, two sacks and one pass deflected.

Sophomore (2000)
In 2000, Pace finished fifth on the team with 50 tackles (33 solo), including 12 tackles for a loss and nine sacks.

Junior (2001)
In 2001, Pace finished sixth on the team recording 62 tackles (36 solo), including 18 tackles for loss and 10 sacks. He recorded one pass deflected and 11 quarterback hurries.

Senior (2002)
In 2002, Pace finished third on the team with 73 tackles (43 solo), including 22 tackles for a loss and eight sacks. He recorded six passes deflected and four quarterback hurries.

While at Wake Forest, Pace was a two-time Second-team All-ACC selection and finished his college career with 189 tackles, 29 sacks, five forced fumbles, and a fumble recovery.

Professional career

Arizona Cardinals
Pace was selected by Arizona Cardinals in the first round (18th overall) in the 2003 NFL Draft.

2003
In 2003, as a rookie, Pace started all 16 games. He recorded a total of 32 tackles and one sack.

2004
In 2004, he played in 14 games, recording 12 tackles and 4.5 sacks.

2005
In 2005, Pace played in only five games with one start. His season was ended when he suffered a laceration of his arm during the Cardinals bye week. Before Pace was placed on injured reserve he recorded 11 tackles and one sack.

2006
In 2006, Pace played in all 16 games, starting five of them. He recorded 29 tackles and one sack.

2007
In 2007, Pace was switched to outside linebacker and started all 16 games. He led the team with 106 tackles. Pace also recorded a career-high 6.5 sacks and one fumble.

In his five seasons with the Cardinals, Pace played in 67 games with 38 starts recording 186 tackles, 14 sacks and 11 passes deflected. While with the Cardinals he also set career highs in tackles, sacks, interceptions, passes deflected and fumble recoveries in 2007 with 106 tackles, 6.5 sacks, six passes deflected, two fumble recoveries, one forced fumble and one interception.

New York Jets

2008
On March 3, 2008, Pace and the New York Jets came to terms on a six-year, $42 million deal that includes $22 million in guaranteed money. He had turned down a previous offer with the Miami Dolphins prior to signing with the Jets. In his first year in New York, Pace compiled 80 tackles (including 63 solo) and 7 quarterback sacks.

2009

Pace was suspended for the first four games of the 2009 season by the NFL after testing positive for performance-enhancing drugs. In the 12 games he played,  Pace recorded 55 tackles, 8 sacks, and 3 forced fumbles. The Jets finished 9-7 and made it to the AFC Championship Game before losing to Peyton Manning and the Indianapolis Colts, falling one game short of the Super bowl.

2010
In August 2010, Pace injured his foot during the preseason. After missing the first four games, Pace started the remainder of the season recording 51 tackles, 5.5 sacks, one interception, and one forced fumble helping the Jets finish 11-5 and advance to the AFC Championship Game for the second consecutive year before losing to the Pittsburgh Steelers by the final score of 24-19.

2011
In 2011, Pace played all 16 games with 53 tackles, 4.5 sacks, 1 interception, 2 passes defended, 1 forced fumble, and 1 fumble recovery.

2012
In 2012, Pace played all 16 games with 35 tackles, 3 sacks, 2 passes defended, 1 forced fumble, and 1 fumble recovery.

2013
Pace was released from the Jets on February 19, 2013. He was re-signed by the team on April 16 to a one-year contract. During the 2013 season, Pace played all 16 games with 37 tackles, 10 sacks, 3 passes defended, and 2 forced fumbles.

2014
The Jets re-signed Pace to a two-year, $5 million contract on March 16, 2014.

On September 13, 2014, Pace was fined $16,537 for a roughing the passer penalty during Week 1 against the Oakland Raiders.

Measurables
 4.65 40 Yard Dash
 31 Inch Vertical
 19 Bench Reps
 4.62 Short Shuttle
 9-foot-7 Broad Jump

Personal life
Pace resides in Atlanta, Georgia.

References
 Football Archive

Notes

External links
 New York Jets bio
 New York Jets Player card at ESPN.com
 Profile at Yahoo! Sports
 Profile at CBSSports.com
 Profile at SI.com

1980 births
Living people
People from Lithia Springs, Georgia
Sportspeople from the Atlanta metropolitan area
Sportspeople from Somerset County, New Jersey
Players of American football from New Jersey
Players of American football from Georgia (U.S. state)
Players of American football from Detroit
American football defensive ends
American football linebackers
Wake Forest Demon Deacons football players
Arizona Cardinals players
New York Jets players